Events in the year 1818 in Art.

Events
 Sir Thomas Lawrence goes to Aachen to paint those present at the third congress.

Works

 Augustus Wall Callcott – The Mouth of the Tyne
 Caspar David Friedrich
 Chalk Cliffs on Rügen
 Seaside by Moonlight
 Wanderer above the Sea of Fog
 Hiroshige
 Eight Views of Omi
 Ten Famous Places in the Eastern Capital
 Jean Auguste Dominique Ingres – The Death of Leonardo da Vinci
 Thomas Sully – Major John Biddle
 David Wilkie – The Penny Wedding

Births
January 21 – Alexander Joseph Daiwaille, Dutch portrait painter (died 1888)
January 26 – Amédée de Noé, French caricaturist and lithographer (died 1879)
January 28 – Alfred Stevens, English sculptor (died 1875)
April 3 – Jean-François Portaels, Flemish orientalist  painter (died 1895)
April 14 – Louisa Beresford, Marchioness of Waterford, French-born British Pre-Raphaelite watercolorist (died 1891)
May 24 – John Henry Foley, Irish sculptor (died 1874)
June 13 – Jean-Jules Allasseur, French sculptor (died 1903)
June 21 – Sir Richard Wallace, 1st Baronet, born Richard Johnson, English francophile art collector and philanthropist (died 1890)
December 7 – Georg Decker, Austro-Hungarian portrait painter (died 1894)
 probable – Alexander Hunter Murray, Scottish-born Canadian fur trader and artist (died 1874)

Deaths
January 5 – Marcello Bacciarelli, Italian painter (born 1731)
February 28 – Anne Vallayer-Coster, French painter (born 1744)
March 15 – Karl Postl, Austrian painter (born 1769)
March 24 – Humphry Repton, English garden designer and artist (born 1752)
August 16 – Carl Frederik von Breda, Swedish painter to the Swedish court (born 1759)
October 4 – Josef Abel, Austrian historical painter and etcher (born 1768)
November 1 – Marie-Gabrielle Capet, French painter (born 1761)
November 5 – Heinrich Füger, German portrait and historical painter (born 1751)
November 19 – Shiba Kōkan, Japanese painter and printmaker (born 1747)
December 10 – Hubert Maurer, Austrian painter of portraits and religious themes (born 1738)
 date unknown
 George Bullock, English sculptor (born 1777)
 Samuel Cotes, English painter of miniature portraits also working in crayons (born 1734)
 Francesco Antonio Franzoni, Italian sculptor (born 1734)

 
Years of the 19th century in art
1810s in art